The 2021–22 season was Ayr United's fourth consecutive season in the Scottish Championship after being promoted from league one in the 2017–18 season. Ayr also competed in the, League Cup, Challenge Cup and the Scottish Cup.

Summary

Season
Ayr United began the season under the management of David Hopkin who had been in charge since March of the previous season. Hopkin would step down from his position on 9 September following a poor start to the season. He was replaced by his assistant Jim Duffy before he was also relieved of his duties by the club after just one win in eleven games. On 7 January 2022, Ayr United confirmed the appointment of Lee Bullen as their new manager.

Results and fixtures

Pre-season

Scottish Championship

Scottish League Cup

Group stage
Results

Knockout stage

Scottish Challenge Cup

Notes

Scottish Cup

Squad statistics

Appearances

|-
|colspan="10"|Players who left the club during the 2021–22 season
|-

|}

Team statistics

League table

League Cup table

Transfers

Transfers in

Transfers out

Loans in

Loans out 

Notes

References

Ayr United F.C. seasons
Ayr